Caro (1967–1989) was an Irish-bred, French-trained Thoroughbred racehorse.

Background
Caro was a grey horse, standing . He was bred in Ireland by his owner, Countess Margit Batthyany, and trained in France with Albert Klimscha

Racing career
As a three-year-old in 1970, Caro won the Poule d'Essai des Poulains after the disqualification of Faraway Son. He then defeated older horses in the Prix d'Ispahan and was third in the Prix du Jockey Club. In the following year, he won the Prix d'Harcourt and the Prix Dollar and set a course record for 2,100 metres at Longchamp in winning the Prix Ganay. He also finished second to Mill Reef in the Eclipse Stakes. He was rated the French champion older male of 1971 with a Timeform rating of 133.

Stud record
Although successful in racing, Caro is best known as a sire both in France, where he was the leading sire in 1977, and in the United States. Caro was sent to Spendthrift Farm in Lexington, Kentucky in the late summer of 1977, where he was highly successful. He died there in 1989 and is buried in their equine cemetery. Caro sired 78 stakes winners including:

 Theia  (foaled 1973)  - 1975 Critérium des Pouliches, French Champion Two-Year-Old Filly
 Madelia  (1974) - won Prix de Diane, Poule d'Essai des Pouliches, Prix Saint-Alary, French Champion Three-Year-Old Filly, retired undefeated
 Crystal Palace (1974) - won Prix du Jockey Club, Leading sire in France (1985)
 Nebos (1976) - 1980 German Horse of the Year, Champion Sire and Champion Broodmare Sire in Germany
 Cozzene (1980) - won Breeders' Cup Mile (1985), American Champion Male Turf Horse (1985)
 Dr. Carter (1981) - multiple Grade 1 winner
 Siberian Express (1981) - Poule d'Essai des Poulains winner, ancestor of 2016 Kentucky Derby winner Nyquist
 Caro's Love (1984) - Broke a 38-year-old track record at Golden Gate Fields Ca, winning a mile race in 1:33, running the fastest 2 turn mile in U.S.A history.
 Tejano (1985) - at two, won the Hollywood Futurity, Arlington-Washington Futurity Stakes, Cowdin Stakes
 Winning Colors (1985) - won 1988 Kentucky Derby, inducted into the United States Racing Hall of Fame
 Turgeon (1986) - European Champion Stayer (1991)
 With Approval (1986) - Canadian Triple Crown winner, Canadian Horse of the Year, Canadian Horse Racing Hall of Fame
 Golden Pheasant (b. 1986) - won 1989 Prix Niel (France), 1990 Arlington Million (United States), 1990 Japan Cup (Japan)

Caro was the broodmare sire of 134 stakes winners, including:
 Red Bullet (b. 1997) - won Preakness Stakes (2000)
 Maria's Mon (b. 1993) - 1995 American Champion Two-Year-Old Colt
 Unbridled's Song (b. 1993) - won 1995 Breeders' Cup Juvenile, 1996 Florida Derby
 Tactical Cat (b. 1996) - won  Hollywood Futurity

Pedigree

References

External links
 Thoroughbred Times profile of Caro

1967 racehorse births
1989 racehorse deaths
Racehorses bred in Ireland
Racehorses trained in France
Champion Thoroughbred Sires of France
Thoroughbred family 3-o
Chefs-de-Race